Thomas Mann (born 28 January 1946) is a German politician who served as a Member of the European Parliament (MEP) from 1994 until 2019. He is a member of the Christian Democratic Union, part of the European People's Party. He was the President of the Tibet Intergroup of the European Parliament from 1999.

Other activities
 Hessischer Rundfunk, Member of the Broadcasting Council

Recognition
Mann's greatest achievements include being awarded the Order of Merit of the Federal Republic of Germany in 2002 for his dedication to human rights issues.

References

External links

1946 births
Living people
Christian Democratic Union of Germany MEPs
Recipients of the Cross of the Order of Merit of the Federal Republic of Germany
MEPs for Germany 2014–2019
MEPs for Germany 2009–2014
MEPs for Germany 2004–2009
MEPs for Germany 1999–2004